Călin Harfaș (born 29 January 2003) is a Romanian professional footballer who plays as a defensive midfielder for Ceahlăul Piatra Neamț.

References

External links
 
 

2003 births
People from Mediaș
Living people
Romanian footballers
Romania youth international footballers
Association football midfielders
Liga I players
CS Gaz Metan Mediaș players
Liga III players
CSM Ceahlăul Piatra Neamț players